The Big Country is an Australian novel by E. V. Timms and Alma Timms. It was the eleventh in the Great South Land Saga of novels; E. V. Timms died before it was finished so his wife Alma completed the novel.

Plot
In the 1870s, beyond in Darling River, a half-caste girl, Jenny Courage, searches for her father, George Crumby, who abandoned her and her mother. George has moved to Sydney and prospered. Jenny works on a river board and becomes a housekeeper on an isolated station.

References

External links
The Big Country at AustLit

1962 Australian novels
Novels set in the 1870s
Angus & Robertson books